Kalahari Tea imports, distributes, and sells a variety of specialty teas via its web site. Founded by Ned Fitch and David Abrahams, the company focused in particular on South African Rooibos or red tea, which it sold in Giant Eagle and GNC stores. Additional lines included its ChocoLatte green tea, citrus-flavored oolong teas, all of which were carried in Publix grocery stores.

References

Pittsburgh Post Gazette – To a Tea – 2/04
Ocala Star Banner – 8/02
Atlanta Journal-Constitution – Athens 'Bean Team' accelerates ambitions – 4/05
Tea Guy Speaks – Tea Review 8 – Kalahari Red 8/05

Tea brands in the United States
Kalahari Tea Company
Tea companies of the United States